The Antipatrid dynasty was a Dorian Greek dynasty of the ancient Greek kingdom of Macedon founded by Cassander, the son of Antipater, who declared himself King of Macedon in 302 BC. This dynasty did not last long; in 294 BC it was swiftly overthrown by the Antigonid dynasty.

Members of the Antipatrid dynasty:

Antipater, regent, not king
Cassander (302–297 BC)
Philip IV of Macedon (297 BC)
Alexander V of Macedon (297–294 BC)
Antipater I (296–294 BC)
Antipater II Etesias (279 BC)

Family tree of Antipatrids

See also
 History of Macedonia (ancient kingdom) 
 Government of Macedonia (ancient kingdom)

References

External links
 List of the Kings of Macedonia

 
 
 
4th-century BC establishments in Greece
302 BC
294 BC